Roberta Hanley is an actress and movie director. She directed the 1998 movie Brand New World, for which she was awarded the Grand Jury Prize for Best Feature Film at the 2001 New York International Independent Film & Video Festival.

Films
 2005: The Nickel Children as The Waitress
 2003: I Love Your Work as Katie's Korner Host
 2003: This Girl's Life as Bored Beverly Hills Housewife
 1999: The Virgin Suicides as Mrs. Weiner
 1998: I Woke Up Early the Day I Died as Housewife
 1998: Modern Vampires (TV Movie) as Saleslady
 1997: This World, Then the Fireworks as Younger Mom Lakewood
 1996: Red Ribbon Blues as Savemore Pharmacist
 1996: Trees Lounge as Roberta
 1996: Freeway as Teacher
 1995: Delta of Venus (film) as Opium Den Proprietor
 1995: Savage Hearts as Lady Owner

External links

American actresses
American women film directors
Living people
Year of birth missing (living people)
21st-century American women